Qoriyoley District is a district in the southeastern Lower Shabelle (Shabeellaha Hoose) region of Somalia. Its capital is Qoryoley.

References

 Districts of Somalia
 Administrative map of Qoriyoley District

Districts of Somalia

Lower Shabelle